In mathematics, a quaternionic structure or -structure is an axiomatic system that abstracts the concept of a quaternion algebra over a field.

References

 

Field (mathematics)
Quadratic forms
Quaternions